John Mactaggart may refer to:

Sir John Mactaggart, 1st Baronet (1867–1956)
Sir John Auld Mactaggart, 2nd Baronet (1898–1960), of the Mactaggart baronets
Sir Ian Auld Mactaggart, 3rd Baronet (1923–1987), of the Mactaggart baronets
Sir John Auld Mactaggart, 4th Baronet (born 1960), Scottish entrepreneur and philanthropist
John Mactaggart of Kilkivan, Queensland

See also 
John McTaggart (disambiguation)